Änglagård is a Swedish progressive rock band, with influences including King Crimson, Genesis, Gentle Giant, Trettioåriga Kriget, Schicke Führs Fröhling, and Van der Graaf Generator. The band was established in 1991 by Tord Lindman (guitars and vocals) and Johan Högberg (bass guitar), and broke up in 1994. They briefly reformed in 2002–2003, and have been active again since 2009. They combine vintage analog sounds with a modern classical approach to composing and arranging. To date, they have released three studio albums and three live recordings to great acclaim from the progressive rock community.

History 
Hybris, the debut release, and the follow-on instrumental Epilog of 1994, were both voted "album of the year" in polls of progressive rock fans.  In 2003 the band briefly reformed (without founding member Lindman), performing new material at several performances, including NEARfest 2003; during this time they débuted the songs that ultimately became "Sorgmantel" and "Längtans klocka" on their third album, though at this point they were untitled. In 2009 Mattias Olsson confirmed that the band had been recording new material on his MySpace blog, though no release date for the new material was announced. In July 2012, Änglagård's third studio album, Viljans Öga, was released.

On October 4, 2012 it was announced on the band's official website that Tord Lindman was back in the band. Also, there were further changes in the line-up with new recruits Erik Hammarström (drums, percussion) and Linus Kåse (keyboards, saxophone). Hammarström is a former member of The Flower Kings. Hammarström and Kåse are also members of Swedish progressive rock band Brighteye Brison. The debut performance with this line-up took place in the venue Bryggarsalen in Stockholm on February 23, 2013. The band continued to tour during the following months. They were the opening act for three nights in a row (March 15—17) with The Crimson ProjeKct at Club Citta' in Kawasaki, Japan. Prog på Svenska: Live in Japan was recorded at these shows and released in 2014.  In April, they performed at the Baja Prog festival in Mexico and the Prog-Résiste Convention in Belgium. On July 14, 2013 Änglagård played at Night of the Prog in Loreley, Germany with former Flower Kings member Jaime Salazar temporarily substituting on drums. Additional live dates in 2013 were Ino-Rock, Poland (August 31) and Melloboat, Sweden/Latvia (September 6).

In 2014, the band only played four shows: in Netherlands (April 11), Mexico (May 23), U.K. (August 3) and Italy (September 6).  In October 2014, the band announced the return of guitarist Jonad Engdegård. In 2015 the band had their busiest year of the millennium, with three shows in February (Italy and Norway), followed by an eight-date April tour across Europe, and finishing with two November dates in Japan and four in the USA.  The February 21, 2015 show in Sandvika, Norway was filmed and recorded and released in 2017 as Änglagård Live: Made in Norway.  In 2017, the band played seven shows, starting with two February shows on the Cruise to the Edge festival (sailing from Tampa, FL), then five spring shows in Sweden, Spain, Canada and the USA (at Rites of Spring festival).

In September 2022, original drummer Matthais Olsson posted on Facebook that he had met with Jonas Engdegård and Johan Brand, and that they had be rehearsing Hybris during its 30th anniversary year).  In December 2022, the band announced they would be playing dates in 2023, focusing on the entire debut album, with a new lineup consisting of Olsson, Brand, and Engdegård, plus two "newcomers" Oskar Forsberg and Staffan Lindroth.  As of mid-January 2023, two dates have been confirmed: June 10 at Minnuendo in Spain and November 3 at the Haugaland Prog & Rock Festival in Norway.

Members
Current line-up
 Johan Brand (born Högberg) – bass, bass pedals, synthesizer (1991–1994, 2002–2003, 2009–present)
 Jonas Engdegård – guitars (1991–1994, 2002–2003, 2009–2012, 2014–present)
 Mattias Olsson – drums, percussion (1991–1994, 2002–2003, 2009–2012, 2022-present)
 Oskar Forsberg – flutes, saxophones, keyboards (2022-present)
 Staffan Lindroth – keyboards (2022-present)

Former members
 Thomas Johnson – keyboards (1991–1994, 2002–2003, 2009–2012)
 Tord Lindman – guitars, vocals, percussion (1991–1994, 2012–2022)
 Anna Holmgren – flute, Mellotron, tenor saxophone, recorder, melodica (1992–1994, 2002–2003, 2009–2022)
 Erik Hammarström – drums, percussion, glockenspiel (2012–2022)
 Linus Kåse – keyboards, soprano saxophone, vocals (2012–2022)

Timeline

Discography

Studio albums

Live albums

References

External links
Official website

Swedish progressive rock groups
Articles which contain graphical timelines
Musea artists